The New York City Department of Environmental Protection Police, also known as DEP Police, and formerly known as the Bureau of Water Supply Police and the Aqueduct Police, is a law enforcement agency in New York City whose duties are to protect and preserve the New York City water supply system maintained by the New York City Department of Environmental Protection, the nation's largest single source water supply. The department has protected and preserved the water supply system for over 100 years.

History 
The Bureau of Water Supply (BWS) Police was created through legislation enacted in the 1906 Water Supply Act. It was not until 1907 that the first provisional appointees were hired and assigned. On July 9, 1908, the first permanent police officers were appointed and assigned to the precincts in Peekskill, Garrison, Browns Station, and High Falls. The Bureau of Water Supply Police was the first police agency in upstate New York with a multiple county police jurisdiction.

In 1908, Rhinelander Waldo was appointed as Chief of the Board of the Aqueduct Police. At this time, there were approximately 60 men assigned to the force. After a few months of service, Rhinelander was appointed Fire Commissioner of the City of New York. He was succeeded by Captain Douglas I. McKay.

Captain McKay selected a number of qualified individuals from the civil service list with the intention of making them Aqueduct Police Sergeants. He created stringent requirements, including that all members must be qualified horseman, and have experience as an officer or non-commissioned officer in the United States Army or the National Guard (with a preference for Spanish–American War Veterans). Approximately two hundred men passed these rigid qualifications and were appointed as sergeants.

At this time, the newly formed Aqueduct Police, a force of 350 officers (300 of these being mounted units) were tasked with ensuring order in the unruly construction site work camps. The first Board of Water Supply Police Precinct was built in Spout Brook, approximately two miles from Peekskill, New York. Other Precincts were built shortly after, each being manned by five sergeants and thirty officers and horses. During World War One, American involvement in the war brought the historic DEP Police to duties protecting the NYC water supply. As of the current today 2019, the DEP Police today still has the same mission guarding the water supply, and is a participant of the annual First Provisional Regiment memorial services, held at the Village of Sleepy Hollow, NY. This Aqueduct Defense Memorial Service honors and remembers 40 soldiers who died while serving New York State during World War I. DEP Police provides an honor guard, cooperates with the NY state defense force, and local government officials to remember those perished while on aqueduct duties.

In 1983, the Bureau of Water Supply became the Department of Environmental Protection and the New York State Legislature revised the Criminal Procedure Law, part of the New York State Laws, to include DEP police officers. In 1999, the DEP jurisdiction was extended to include the five boroughs of New York City. 

In 2004, the highest court in the state, the New York State Court of Appeals, affirmed the DEP Police Department's jurisdiction throughout the watershed. Members of the DEP Police are New York State [sworn] police officers (not NYS peace officers, which many other NYC law enforcement agencies are).

Today 

The NYC Department of Environmental Protection Police investigate over 4000 complaints per year, 500 of these related to environmental crimes. 

Environmental crimes include storm water complaints, water pollution and the illegal transportation, storage, and disposal of hazardous waste. Additionally they investigate waste water treatment plant and septic system failures as well as dumping complaints.

Jurisdiction
The DEP department maintains jurisdiction in 14 counties including the 5 counties in New York City.

Department Units
The department has a full-time Aviation Unit, as well as: 

ESU Team, 
Marine Patrol, 
UTV Patrol, 
K-9 Patrol
and Detective Bureau.

Rank structure 
There are seven titles (referred to as ranks) in the New York City Department of Environmental Protection Police:

Training 
Training takes place in Kingston, NY for 6 months and 1-month at the precinct assigned to the trainee. Recruits are expected to move to Kingston, NY for the duration of the academy. Class sizes vary between 20 and 40 recruits and there is a new academy class every few years.

See also 

 List of law enforcement agencies in New York
 New York City water supply system
 New York State Department of Environmental Conservation Police
 New York City Department of Sanitation Police

References

External links 
 NYC DEP Website
 NYC DEP PBA

1906 establishments in New York City
Specialist police departments of New York (state)
Law enforcement agencies of New York City
Environmental agencies in New York (state)
Water infrastructure of New York City